The Schleswig Geest or Schleswig-Holstein Geest ( or Schleswigsche Geest) is one of the three landscape types in the north German state of Schleswig-Holstein; the others being the coastal marshland to the west and the Schleswig-Holstein Uplands to the east. The geest region, which is also referred to as the central ridge of Schleswig-Holstein, stretches as the High Geest (Hohe Geest) from the Danish border in a wide strip past Bredstedt, Hohenwestedt and Itzehoe to the Hamburg area and to Lauenburg. Between the marshes of North Frisia and Dithmarschen and the High Geest lies the so-called Fore-Geest (Vorgeest) as a narrow strip, which extends inland roughly in the area of Owschlag. In the western lowlands there are isolated 'geest islands' (e.g. Stapelholm and Invent).

The Schleswig Geest was settled in the 6th century by the Danes and Jutes. The Ochsenweg ("Ox Road"), one of the most important communication arteries in the North European region, runs through the Schleswig Geest. The so-called Geest Ridge (Geestrücken) was the best strip of land for a north-south route. Whilst the marsh was too soft and wet for long-distance roads on which to move cattle and armies, the Angeln was too hilly. However, its sandy soils contrast with the fertile soils of the marshes and hill country.

Geest areas in Schleswig-Holstein
 Schleswig Geest with the Bredstedt-Husum Geest
 Geest islands (Geestkerne) of Amrum, Föhr and Sylt (Geestkern Islands)
 Heide-Itzehoe Geest with the Dithmarschen Geest, Hohenwestedt Geest and Münsterdorf Geest Island

References

Sources 
 Jochen Missfeldt: Die Geest (in "Deutsche Landschaften") S. Fischer Verlag, 

Natural regions of Germany
Regions of Schleswig-Holstein
Geest